Eurythoe is a genus of polychaetes belonging to the family Amphinomidae.

The genus has almost cosmopolitan distribution.

Species:

Eurythoe brasiliensis 
Eurythoe clavata 
Eurythoe complanata 
Eurythoe dubia 
Eurythoe encopochaeta 
Eurythoe hedenborgi 
Eurythoe heterotricha 
Eurythoe indica 
Eurythoe karachiensis 
Eurythoe laevisetis 
Eurythoe latissima 
Eurythoe longicirra 
Eurythoe matthaii 
Eurythoe paupera 
Eurythoe rullieri 
Eurythoe syriaca

References

Annelids